Time of Our Lives was a concert residency held at The AXIS in Las Vegas by American rapper Pitbull. The show opened on September 23, 2015 and closed on May 25, 2019.

Shows

References

2015 concert residencies
2016 concert residencies
2017 concert residencies
2018 concert residencies
2019 concert residencies
Concert residencies in the Las Vegas Valley
Pitbull (rapper) concert tours
Zappos Theater